Malhargarh Assembly constituency is one of the 230 Vidhan Sabha (Legislative Assembly) constituencies of Madhya Pradesh state in central India.

It is part of Mandsaur District.

See also
 Malhargarh

References

Assembly constituencies of Madhya Pradesh